The 1924 United States presidential election in Colorado took place on November 4, 1924, as part of the 1924 United States presidential election which was held throughout all contemporary forty-eight states. Voters chose six representatives, or electors to the Electoral College, who voted for president and vice president.

Between 1896 and 1916, Colorado had been strongly Democratic-leaning due to that party’s adoption of free silver in this silver-mining state; however, in 1920 Warren G. Harding carried every county in the state. In the following few years the Ku Klux Klan grew extremely rapidly in Colorado and by the time of the next election it was close to taking control of the state government. The Klan was aided by structural problems in Colorado’s agriculture and fear of Catholicism embedded in Mexican immigration and the traditional Catholicism of the Hispanic south-central counties.

As it turned out, the strong economy ensured that incumbent President Calvin Coolidge would have little trouble carrying the state, despite the strong third-party candidacy of Wisconsin Senator Robert M. La Follette, who was opposed to the powerful Klan and struggled in the anti-Catholic High Plains.

 this is the last occasion Costilla County has voted for a Republican presidential candidate.

Full results

Results by county

Notes

References
 

Colorado
1924
1924 Colorado elections